, known by her stage name , is a Japanese actress and model. She studied at Mejiro University, where she majored in English.

History

Personal life
She married actor Joe Odagiri, who is exactly 11 years her senior, on February 16, 2008, the birthday the couple share. She gave birth to two sons in both February 2011 and April 2014. The youngest son died a year later due to an intestinal obstruction.

Kashii's maternal grandfather is a European-American newspaper reporter, and thus her ethnic background is ¼ European.  Kashii spent her childhood in Singapore and attended elementary school there. She has been said to have exactly the same dimensions for her right and left side of the face which led to a German doctor wanting to use her face as a specimen for research uses.

Biography
Kashii got her start in the entertainment business as an in-house model for the Japanese teen magazine mc Sister in 2001. Her first acting role was in the movie adaptation of Lorelei: The Witch of the Pacific Ocean in which she played the title character.

Filmography

Movies

Dramas and television

Video games

References

External links
 
 HORIPRO Official site: 香椎由宇 (In Japanese)
 Wikipedia:ja:香椎由宇| Japanese Wikipedia

Japanese female models
Living people
1987 births
Actresses from Kanagawa Prefecture
Japanese people of American descent
Models from Kanagawa Prefecture
People from Ayase, Kanagawa
Japanese film actresses
Japanese stage actresses
Japanese television actresses
21st-century Japanese actresses